The Exmoor Steam Railway is a narrow gauge steam railway and locomotive manufacturer, located at Bratton Fleming in North Devon.

gauge
The railway was built by the Stirland family and first opened as a tourist attraction in August 1990.  At this time the railway ran in a circuit from the main station at Exmoor Central, trains descending on a large embankment before climbing back up through a spiral tunnel. In 1996 a new station was opened at Cape of Good Hope, which changed the line to an "end-to-end" layout. At the end of the 2001 season, the decision was taken to close the railway to the public and concentrate on building new steam locomotives and associated equipment. The railway remains in full working order, and work started in the winter 2008/9 on extending the railway. By mid-2010 an additional  of track had been brought into use, with a very steep ascending and descending ruling gradients of 1 in 28.

gauge
During the 1990s, a number of  gauge Beyer Garratt articulated locomotives from South Africa arrived on site and were displayed. One locomotive was sold to the Welsh Highland Railway in 2006, whilst another has been under long-term restoration.

Locomotives

Engineering works

Since the railway opened, there has been a large workshop on site, which was used to build all the locomotives and equipment used on the railway.  In 2001, the decision was taken to close the railway as a tourist attraction and concentrate on the manufacture of miniature and narrow gauge railway equipment.

Exmoor Steam Railway builds several new steam locomotives a year, as well as rolling stock and also advise on the setup and expansion of miniature and narrow gauge railways. Exmoor is a member of Britain's Great Little Railways and has supplied locomotives to many other members who operate public miniature and narrow gauge railways.

Locomotives constructed

References

Don.Fifer The Heywood Society Journal No.56 Spring 2005

External links
Exmoor Steam Railway
Rudyard Lake Steam Railway the largest Exmoor locomotive user

Locomotive manufacturers of the United Kingdom
12¼ in gauge railways in England
Rail transport in Devon
Exmoor